Dan Peer is a Professor and the Director of the Laboratory of Precision NanoMedicine at Tel Aviv University (TAU). He is also the Vice President for Research and Development at TAU. In 2017 he co-founded and acts as the managing director of SPARK Tel Aviv, Center for Translational Medicine. From 2016–2020 he was the chair of the TAU Cancer Biology Research Center.

Peer is a scientific advisory board member in more than 15 companies and on the scientific advisory board of 20 journals. He is a past President of the Israeli Chapter of the Controlled Release Society. In 2014 he was elected to the Israel Young Academy of Science. In 2023 he was elected to the US National Academy of Engineering.

Research work
Peer lab is designing novel genetic medicines with targeted lipid nanoparticles and various RNA payloads. Peer's work was among the first to demonstrate immunomodulation through a systemic delivery of RNA-loaded targeted nanocarriers. He pioneered the use of RNAi to reprogram immune cells and discover new therapeutic modalities. In addition, his lab was the first to show systemic, cell specific delivery of mRNA in an animal. Through this method they have induced therapeutic gene expression of desired proteins (including novel approaches for high efficiency therapeutic genome editing), which has implications in cancer, rare genetic diseases and infection diseases. Recently, his lab was the  first to develop a bacterial mRNA vaccine, which could provide a fast response against bacterial infection and microbial resistant strains. 

His lab utilizes nanotechnology tools to generate novel genetic medicines for inflammatory diseases, rare genetic diseases and cancers. They are designing highly selective targeted nanocarriers able to reprogram cells in a discerning manner, with an ultimate goal to translate the findings into clinical settings.

Awards
2008 Alon fellowship for outstanding young researchers, awarded by the Israeli Ministry of Education.
The 2010 Innovator award in Inflammatory Bowel Disease from the Kenneth Rainin Foundation (CA, USA)
2013 Breakthrough Award from the Kenneth Rainin Foundation
Innovator Award on novel Cancer therapeutic strategy (The inaugural Untold News Award, 2014)<ref></ref
2014 Elected Member, Israel Young Academy.
2023 Elected International Member, US National Academy of Engineering.

References

External links 
 
 Patents by Dan Peer

Living people
Academic staff of Tel Aviv University
Year of birth missing (living people)